Shung Him Tong Tsuen is a village in the Lung Yeuk Tau area of Fanling, North District, Hong Kong.

Administration
Shung Him Tong is a recognized village under the New Territories Small House Policy. It is one of the villages represented within the Fanling District Rural Committee. For electoral purposes, Shung Him Tong Tsuen is part of the Queen's Hill constituency, which is currently represented by Law Ting-tak.

Features
 Kin Tak Lau, Nos. 15-16 Shung Him Tong Tsuen, Grade I historic building
 Shek Lo, Grade I historic building
 Tsung Kyam Church, No. 20 Shung Him Tong Tsuen, Grade III historic building

References

Further reading
 (about a Christian Hakka community in Shung Him Tong Tsuen)

External links

 Delineation of area of existing village Shung Him Tong (East) (Fanling) for election of resident representative (2019 to 2022)
 Delineation of area of existing village Shung Him Tong (West) (Fanling) for election of resident representative (2019 to 2022)
 Film Services Office: Shung Him Tong Village

Villages in North District, Hong Kong
Lung Yeuk Tau